Body Head Bangerz is a hip hop group based in Pensacola, Florida and formed by former heavyweight boxing champion Roy Jones Jr. Originally consisting of Jones, Magic, Choppa, Snappa, and Bone Crusher the current roster includes Jones, SM Bullet and Ms.Kandi.

The group's 2004 debut album, Body Head Bangerz: Volume One, was released under Jones' Body Head Entertainment imprint and featured cameos by YoungBloodZ, Juvenile, Lil' Flip, Bun B and Petey Pablo.

On March 1, 2013, Magic and his wife were killed in a traffic collision in Mississippi, with his daughter the lone survivor.

The group's first material in over a decade, Body Head Bangerz: The EP, was released August 21, 2015 under Jones' new label Body Head Bangerz Music and featured the non-charting single "Can't Lose".

Discography

Studio albums
Body Head Bangerz: Volume One (2004)
Body Head Bangerz: The EP (2015)

Singles

References

External links
 

American hip hop groups
Southern hip hop groups